Rajpara (originally Rajpura) is a village and former Hindu non-salute Rajput princely state (native state) on Saurashtra peninsula in Gujarat, western India.

History 
The Fifth Class Non-Salute Princely state and taluka, in Halar prant, was ruled by Jadeja Rajput Chieftains by primogeniture. It is an offshoot of the Kotda-Sangani State, whose first Thakur (title) Togujiraj, the founder of the house, the second son of Sangoji of Kotda-Sangani, received in appanage (jagir) with some other villages.

In 1901 it comprised twelve more villages, covering 39 square kilometers, with a combined population of 1,862 in 1901 (2,268 in 1921), yielding 13,654 Rupees state revenue (1903-4, mostly from land; later 27,000 Rs), paying 3,163 Rupees tribute, to the British and Junagadh State.

The Rajpura housed one of the most elegant houses in its time, the royal house, Rangmahel, having a scenic landscape surrounding itself, also served as the administrative office of the Taluka Rajpura.

Thakurs 
 Togujiraj Sangojiraj [Togaji], first Thakur
 Merujiraj Togujiraj, son of the above
 Asajiraj Merujiraj, son of the above
 Ladhajiraj Asajiraj, son of the above
 Waghjiraj Ladhajiraj,  son of the above, died childless
 Bhimjiraj Ladhajiraj, brother of the above, -/1884
 Asajiraj Bhimjiraj, born 1846, son of Bhimjiraj Ladhajiraj, succeeded 25 April 1884

 Lakhajiraj Asajiraj, born 30 July 1869, son of the above, succeeded 27 December 1903

 Prithvirajsinhji Lakhajiraj, son of above, succeeded throne in 1913

Nirmalsinhji Prithvirajsinhji, grandson of the above (son of Yuvraj Saheb Prithvirajji Lakhajiraj)
Present Rajvijaysinhji Shivbhadrasinhji, born on 9th March 1966 grandson of the above (son of Yuvraj Saheb Shivbhadrasinhji Nirmalsinhji)
Present Yuvrajsaheb Kirtirajsinhji Rajvijaysinhji Jadeja, born 4th September 1991(son of above)
present tikkasaheb yadoksharajsinhji kirtirajsinhji jadeja,born 7th November 2021(son of above)

See also 
 Rajpara State (Gohelwar)

References

External links and sources 
History
 Imperial Gazetteer, on DSAL.UChicago.edu - Kathiawar
 Indian Princely States on web.archive.org

Princely states of Gujarat
Rajput princely states